Woodburn is an unincorporated area in Pictou County, Nova Scotia, Canada.

Location
This settlement is located at the west end of Merigomish Harbour,  on the north shore of Nova Scotia.

History
John Wood received a grant of land here in 1810, and the Scottish word, "burn" means rivulet or brook, hence its name  "Woods Brook."

References

Communities in Pictou County